The fourth edition of the Hip Hop World Awards was hosted by Banky W. and Kemi Adetiba. It took place on May 16, 2009, at the International Conference Centre in Abuja, Nigeria. The awards were held outside of Lagos for the first time. 9ice won a total of three awards from six nominations.

Winners and nominees

References

2009 music awards
2009 in Nigerian music
The Headies